Walt Disney's Mickey Mouse (also The Floyd Gottfredson Library) is a 2011–2018 series of books collecting the span of work by Floyd Gottfredson on the daily Mickey Mouse comic strip in twelve volumes, as well as Gottfredson's Sunday strips of the same title over two separate volumes.  The strips are reproduced from Disney proof sheets and artwork from private collections.

Background
The strip debuted on January 13, 1930, and was initially written by Walt Disney and drawn first by Ub Iwerks, then by Win Smith.  Gottfredson took over the strip when Disney and Smith found themselves too busy, and he continued with it until 1975.  These volumes start with Gottfredson's work from April 1, 1930, while including the earlier non-Gottfredson strips in an appendix to the first volume.  The series is uncensored, and as the strips were done in the 1930s, some of the strips may come across as offensive to modern readers, especially due to racial stereotypes that were common at the time. As presented in the books, however, the more dated material is accompanied by explanatory text, putting it in the context of its historical time.

Gottfredson's run on Mickey Mouse lasted until 1975.  In the earlier years, which are the focus of this series, it was a humorous adventure strip—as was common at the time—but in the later years became gag-focused.

These books are the first time Gottfredson's work has been collected in North America, although they've previously been collected in the 1980s in Germany as The Complete Daily Strip Adventures of Mickey Mouse 1930–1955 and in 2010 in Italy as Gli anni d'oro di Topolino.

Format
The hardcover volumes have been edited by David Gerstein and Gary Groth while designed by Jacob Covey, and are in a 10.5 inches × 8.75" inches (267 mm × 222 mm) landscape format.  They are mostly in black-and-white, with some color pages, and each collects two years worth of strips.  The strips are printed three to a page, with dozens of pages of supplementary  material. The two Color Sundays volumes are in full color.

The comic strips in the volumes have been reproduced from Disney's own master proof sheets of the strip.

The books of the series were available separately as well as in two-volume box sets.

Volumes and box sets

Box sets

List of storylines featured in the series

Daily strips

Sunday strips

Reception

The series was given much praise for its production quality, the quality of the reproduction of the strips, and the extensiveness of the extra material.

Awards
 2012
 Volume one and two of the series won the Eisner award for "Best archival collection/project" in the strip category.
 The series was nominated for the Harvey Award in the category "Best Domestic Reprint Project".
 2015
Volume five and six of the series were nominated for the Eisner award in the category "Best Archival Collection/Project - Strips (at least 20 years old)".

Related

Free Comic Book Day 2011

In 2010 it was announced that Fantagraphics would participate in the promotional campaign Free Comic Book Day in May, 2011. They would release a comic book issue titled Walt Disney's Mickey Mouse featuring a Mickey Mouse story by Floyd Gottfredson. The one storyline included in the issue was Pluto the Racer.

See also
Donald Duck: The Complete Daily Newspaper Comics
Donald Duck: The Complete Sunday Comics
Silly Symphonies: The Complete Disney Classics
The Complete Carl Barks Disney Library
The Don Rosa Library

References

External links
Fantagraphics Books = Walt Disney's Mickey Mouse - The Floyd Gottfredson Library

Video preview of the first volume at Fantagraphics' website
Previews  of the books at Fantagraphics' website
19-page preview of the first volume (PDF)
19-page preview of the second volume (PDF)
Previews of the books at Issuu
Preview - Walt Disney's Mickey Mouse: Vol. 5
Preview - Walt Disney's Mickey Mouse Vol. 6
Preview - Walt Disney's Mickey Mouse Vol. 7
Preview - Walt Disney's Mickey Mouse Vol. 8
Preview - Walt Disney's Mickey Mouse - Color Sundays Vol. 1
Preview - Walt Disney's Mickey Mouse - Color Sundays Vol. 2
 Interview with series' editor David Gerstein - ComicsAlliance.com - "Mickey Mouse Editor David Gerstein On Bringing Floyd Gottfredson's Strips To A Modern Audience"

Mickey Mouse
Mickey Mouse comics
Comic strip collection books
Fantagraphics titles
Disney comics titles
Disney comic strips
Comics about animals
Comics about mice and rats
Eisner Award winners